This page is a list of all the matches that Portugal national football team has played between 1960 and 1979.

Results

1960s

1960

1961

1962

1963

1964

1965

1966

1967

1968

1969

1970s

1970

1971

1972

1973

1974

1975

1976

1977

1978

1979

External links
Portugal: Fixtures and Results – FIFA.com
Seleção A Jogos e Resultados FPF
Portugal national football team match results
Portugal – International Results

1960s in Portugal
1970s in Portugal
Portugal national football team results